Translation Studies is a triannual peer-reviewed academic journal covering translation studies. It was established in 2008 and is published by Routledge. The editor-in-chief is Piotr Blumczyński (Queen's University Belfast).

Abstracting and indexing 
The journal is abstracted and indexed in:
Arts & Humanities Citation Index
Current Contents/Social & Behavioral Sciences
Current Contents/Arts & Humanities
EBSCO databases
Linguistic Abstracts Online
MLA International Bibliography
Social Sciences Citation Index
According to the Journal Citation Reports, the journal has a 2019 impact factor of 0.947.

References

External links

Translation journals
Routledge academic journals
English-language journals
Triannual journals
Publications established in 2008